Horse Bluff Landing is an unincorporated community in Livingston Parish, Louisiana, United States.

Redding cemetery
An early 19th century cemetery is located at Horse Bluff Landing with ten graves total and eight unmarked graves. The cemetery is named after the Redding family, early pioneers that settled in the area.

References

Unincorporated communities in Livingston Parish, Louisiana
Unincorporated communities in Louisiana
Unincorporated communities in New Orleans metropolitan area